Isobel, Lady Barnett (born Isobel Morag Marshall; 30 June 1918 – 20 October 1980), popularly known as Lady Isobel Barnett, was a Scottish radio and television personality, who had her highest profile during the 1950s and 1960s.

Early life
Barnett was born in Aberdeen, Scotland, the daughter of a doctor. She went to the independent Mount School in York and, following in her father's footsteps, studied medicine at the University of Glasgow. She qualified as a doctor in 1940 and married solicitor and company director Geoffrey Barnett the following year. He was knighted for political and public services to the city of Leicester in 1953. Lady Barnett gave up her medical career in 1948, and for the next 20 years was a Justice of the Peace.

Radio and television
In 1953 Lady Barnett arrived on BBC television as one of the panel of What's My Line?, which made her a household name. She appeared on the programme for ten years but was not an original panelist, her seat having been previously occupied by Marghanita Laski.

She was regarded by audiences as elegant and witty, the epitome of the British aristocracy, although her title actually came from the fact that her solicitor husband had been knighted; the form Lady Isobel Barnett suggested she possessed a courtesy title, but she was not an aristocrat, nor had she married into the aristocracy. She also made regular appearances on the BBC radio series Any Questions, on the radio panel game Many a Slip and on the women's discussion series Petticoat Line. She was greatly in demand as an after-dinner speaker, a role into which she slipped confidently.

In 1956, a reviewer predicted that an alien visiting from another planet could ask anyone between the ages of seven and 70 "What is What's my Line?" and "Who is Isobel Barnett?" and be confident of getting an answer. She featured in the first revival of What's My Line? which ran for two series from 1973 to 1974.

Later life and death
In her last years, Lady Barnett became reclusive and eccentric. In 1980 she was found guilty of shoplifting, and fined £75 for stealing a can of tuna and a carton of cream worth 87 pence from her village grocer. This brought her briefly back into the public eye; four days later on 20 October, she was found dead at her home in Cossington, Leicestershire.

A coroner's inquest subsequently ruled that Lady Barnett killed herself with an overdose of painkillers in her bath.  During the inquest, police testified that she wore an extra spacious pocket, known as a poacher's pocket, inside her coat when she was caught stealing the groceries.  Two days before her death, Lady Barnett told an interviewer she was a compulsive thief and had been shoplifting for years.  Finding that Lady Barnett, a trained physician, killed herself deliberately with an overdose of arthritis painkiller, coroner Guy Tooze said, "She had recently suffered one of the most traumatic experiences any woman could suffer".  Tooze went on to say, "I am satisfied she took a fatal overdose deliberately and knew what she was doing".

Lady Barnett's story was recounted by several of her friends and colleagues in a 1991 BBC Radio 4 documentary in the Radio Lives series, in which it was said that she gave no indication to any of her friends that she was planning to take her own life, and that she kept up a façade of "business as usual".

Personal life
Lady Barnett had one son, Alastair (who died 31 March 2020 aged 77). Her husband, Sir Geoffrey, died in 1970. Her autobiography, My Life Line, was published in 1956.

References

External links

1918 births
1980 suicides
Alumni of the University of Glasgow
British television personalities
People from Aberdeen
Drug-related suicides in England
People educated at The Mount School, York
People from Cossington, Leicestershire
1980 deaths